Vulgaires Machins is a French Canadian punk rock group from Granby, Quebec.  The group consists of Guillaume Beauregard (vocals, guitars),  Marie-Ève Roy (vocals, guitars), Maxime Beauregard (bass) and Patrick Landry (drums).  Their lyrics denounce consumerism and modern decadence.

History
Vulgaires Machins was formed in 1995. The next year they released their first album, La vie est belle.

Their album Compter les corps was nominated for the Juno Award for Francophone Album of the Year at the Juno Awards of 2007.

They were also nominated for French Video of the Year at the 2007 MuchMusic Video Awards ("Compter les corps"), and in 2010 their song "Parasites" won the French ECHO songwriting prize. In 2012 they were featured on CBC Television's Studio 12.

Guillaume Beauregard has also released music as a solo artist, receiving a SOCAN Songwriting Prize nomination in 2015 for his solo single "De pluie et de cendre", and has had acting roles including in Maxime Giroux's 2008 film Tomorrow (Demain).

Discography

Albums
 1996: La vie est belle (independent)
 1998: 24-40 (Indica Records)
 2000: Regarde le monde (Indica Records)
 2002: Aimer le mal (Indica Records)
 2004: Cross the bridge/Passe le pont split with Burning Heads (independent/Enrage Production)
 2006: Compter les corps (Indica Records)
 2008: Presque Sold-Out (CD/DVD) (Indica Records)
 2010: Requiem pour les sourds (Indica Records)
 2022: Disruption (Costume Records)

Participation in compilations
 1997: Inhale vol. 2 (Indica Records)
 1999?: All that bunch of punkers (R.A.D.)
 1999 : 1, 2, 3 Punk
 Independent vol. 1
 2 tongue 2

References

External links
 Vulgaires Machins official site

Canadian punk rock groups
Musical groups established in 1995
Musical groups from Quebec
Granby, Quebec
1995 establishments in Quebec